"Nazi Punks Fuck Off" is the fifth single by Dead Kennedys. It was released in 1981 on Alternative Tentacles with "Moral Majority" as the B-side. Both are from the In God We Trust, Inc. EP, although the EP version is a different recording from the single version. The single included a free armband with a crossed-out swastika.  The design was later adopted as a symbol for the anti-racist punk movement Anti-Racist Action.

The song is a blunt indictment of the rise of far-right punk subcultures such as Nazi punk or the white power skinhead movement, which had begun rioting at punk shows in the late 1970s. The appropriation of fascist iconography had been common in punk for some time, often ironically, but the irony was not always clear to the extent that it began attracting the organized far-right to punk concerts. Jello Biafra's lyrics condemn the infighting among punks for weakening the prospect of rebellion and hold of the far-right agitators that "in a real Fourth Reich, [they'd] be the first to go."

In the opening of the In God We Trust, Inc. version of "Nazi Punks Fuck Off", lead singer Jello Biafra mentions English producer Martin Hannett, who had worked with Joy Division and Buzzcocks, accusing him, tongue-in-cheek, of having "overproduced" the recording. Hannett, in fact, did not work with Dead Kennedys.

Charts

Cover versions
 The English grindcore band Napalm Death recorded a cover for their 1993 EP of the same name.
 The fictional band The Ain't Rights performed a cover of the song in a modern-day white supremacist club in the 2015 horror film Green Room.
 The German black metal band Hyems released a song titled "Nazi Black Metal Fuck Off" on their 2018 EP 1997. The song also appeared on the 2022 antifascist compilation Black Metal Rainbows.

References

Sources
Blush, Steven. "American Hardcore: A Tribal History". Feral House, 2001. 
Robbins, Ira. "The Trouser Press guide to '90s rock". Simon & Schuster, 1997.

External links 
 Dead Kennedys Official site with lyrics

1981 singles
Dead Kennedys songs
Songs against racism and xenophobia
Songs about punk
1993 EPs
Napalm Death EPs
Earache Records EPs
Napalm Death songs
Anti-fascist music
1981 songs

pl:Nazi Punks Fuck Off